The Department for Aviation, previously the State Committee of Aviation of the Republic of Belarus is a government agency of Belarus, headquartered in Minsk. It was previously headquartered at Aerodromnaja Street in Minsk.

It was established by the President of Belarus to coordinate aviation activity inside Belarus. It can be compared to the United States Federal Aviation Administration in its activities and duties. The committee (Госкомавиация) works with other state bodies and agencies (bodies), companies and organizations.

All civil aviation activities and civil airports fall under the jurisdiction of the committee. Several repair facilities, air traffic control towers and aviation schools also fall under the jurisdiction of the committee.

Since 1993, Belarus has been an accredited member of the International Civil Aviation Organization. Historically, during the period when Belarus was a republic of the Soviet Union, the activities of the committee were handled by the Russian civil aviation authority, Aeroflot.

Airlines 
Though it is not known how many airlines operate and are registered in Belarus, one airline called Belavia has membership in the IATA. Belavia (Белавиа) is short for Belarusian Airlines, was established in 1996 by state law and is the only Belarusian member of the IATA. Belavia was formed from the Belarusian Association of Civil Aviation, which already had over 60 years of experience in the transportation of people and cargo.

Two other airlines are operating under the committee, but they do not hold the title of National Air Carrier. The two airlines, which hold the title of Air Carrier are Gomelavia Airlines and TransAVIAexport Airlines. Gomelavia performs charter services for Belarusian oil workers who need to be sent to the western regions of Siberia, Transaviaexport is used by the Belarusian Government as their official planes when moving cargo.

References

External links

Official Website 
Official Website (Archive) - English website 2005-2008
Belavia website (English version)

Government of Belarus
Aviation in Belarus
Belarus
Transport organizations based in Belarus